Methodist Boys' School, Kuala Lumpur (abbreviated MBS Kuala Lumpur) is a semi-government aided Cluster School of Excellence and High Performance School in Kuala Lumpur, Malaysia. It was founded in July 1897, making it one of the oldest schools in Malaysia. It is known as MBS and its students are known as MBSians. The school is also known as Horley School, a reference to one of its principals, Rev. William E. Horley, who was responsible for changing and giving the school its present name from the previous name of Anglo-Tamil School. The name Horley School has been widely misunderstood as a reference to marble, which is also called Horley in Chinese, a game that was popular amongst its students then. It is noted for its library, which attracts visits from many other schools.

The school was founded by Christian missionary Dr. Kensett in July 1897. The school population grew to be overwhelmingly Indian and the school was named Anglo-Tamil School, at a small wooden shophouse at the corner of Batu Road and Java Street, since demolished.

In 1899, Rev. Abraham became its first headmaster, leading a staff of four teachers. It was then registered as a government-aided school.

Three years later, the MBS proper was founded by Rev. W. E. Horley at the temporary premises of an unused pork market in Malacca Street. The Anglo-Tamil School was absorbed into it, opening up the school to all races.

In 1904, the school decided to move to Petaling Hill (its present site) after a few evacuations by the sanitary board due to the dilapidated condition of the buildings. Within eight months, enough funds had been collected to erect a new building. Two new wings were constructed and a playing field laid down. In 2008, Methodist Boys' Secondary School was awarded cluster school status by the Malaysian Ministry of Education (MOE).

MBS anthem

English version

The School Song was composed in 1948 by former principal, Hugh F. Clancy. The music was harmonised by N.Swan, in the same year. The song was adapted from the originally titled "Go Northwestern Go", written in 1912 by Theodore Van Etten, a member of the Northwestern University Wildcat Marching Band then. The school anthem was sung over Radio Malaya in 1949 by the school choir.

Go forward MBS
Filled with courage fine
With your colours flying
We will cheer you all the time
And so you go forward MBS
On to victory
Work for the fame of our fair name
Forward we must play the game

The Malay Version was drafted during a competition to translate the school song in Malay in which Cheok Heng Wai of 5 Mori (1995), at that time, won the competition and this was the lyrics that followed.

Malay version 
The Song was translated into the national language in 1995.

Majulah MBS
Penuh azam baru
Dengan semangat waja
Kita menjulangkan namamu
Majulah MBS
Raih kejayaan
Harumkan namamu selalu
Kekalkan keunggulan

Source: Excelsior 1954 and Excelsior 2006

Co-curricular

Uniform bodies
There are 7 uniformed bodies in the school as of 2009. Some examples are:

10th Kuala Lumpur Air Scout Group
10th Kuala Lumpur Air Scouts was established in 1915 and absorbed 15th Kuala Lumpur Scouts Troop after the second World War.

1st Kuala Lumpur Boys' Brigade Company
Founded by Khoo Onn Soo under the sponsorship of Wesley Methodist Church, Kuala Lumpur in 1954. 1st Kuala Lumpur Boys Brigade was the first of the companies to be established in Kuala Lumpur.

Kuala Lumpur No.6 Ambulance Cadet Division of St. John Ambulance Malaysia 
KLN6ACD is a division under St. John Ambulance of Malaysia, part of an international voluntary service organisation dedicated to training and providing first aid skills. The division has had numerous achievements in competitions at the state and national levels, and continues to be a major contributor in voluntary first aid service within the school as well as the public through duties coordinated by the State Officers.

Former principals

Alumni association

The alumni association of MBSSKL is known as MBSalumni, previously known as MBSOBA (Methodist Boys' School Old Boys Association). Its first documented meeting was in 1919. It was set up with the objective of providing a platform for all former students to keep in touch with each other and also to maintain contact with the school.

Notable alumni

Business
Tan Sri Lim Kok Thay - Chairman, Genting Group and Star Cruises

Law
Lai Kew Chai - Former Supreme Court of Singapore Judge

Public service
 Cheong Choong Kong - Chairman of the Oversea-Chinese Banking Corporation Singapore and former CEO of Singapore Airlines

Politics
 Ong Tee Keat - 8th President of the Malaysian Chinese Association, former Transport Minister of Malaysia
 Ong Pang Boon - Former Minister for Education of Singapore, was a prominent first-generation member of the People's Action Party (PAP)
 Syed Hamid Albar - Former Home Minister of Malaysia
 Raja Nong Chik Zainal Abidin - Former Minister of Federal Territories and Urban Well-Being of Malaysia

Media and entertainment
 Awal Ashaari - Actor and TV host
 Faizal Hussein - Actor and TV host

Medical
Noor Hisham Abdullah - Endocrine surgeon and current Director General of Health of the Malaysian Ministry of Health, since 1 March 2013
Dr Gerard Loh - Physician

References

External links
 Companion Blog of Unofficial eGroup

Educational institutions established in 1897
Secondary schools in Malaysia
Publicly funded schools in Malaysia
Methodist schools in Malaysia
Boys' schools in Malaysia
Primary schools in Malaysia
1897 establishments in British Malaya